Shaare Zedek Synagogue was a Conservative Jewish synagogue founded in 1905 in St. Louis, Missouri, United States. In 2013 the synagogue merged with Brith Sholom Kneseth Israel synagogue in St. Louis, Missouri to become Kol Rinah.

Shooting
On October 8, 1977, guests who attended a bar mitzvah were leaving Brith Sholom Kneseth Israel synagogue when white supremacist Joseph Paul Franklin began shooting at them, killing Gerald Gordon, and wounding Steven Goldman and William Ash.

References

External links
Faith Family Future: Shaare Zedek by Shaare Zedek Synagogue, Shaare Zedek Synagogue (St. Louis, Missouri), 2005
Community Directory, 

Jews and Judaism in St. Louis
20th-century synagogues
Jewish organizations established in 1905
Conservative synagogues in Missouri
Buildings and structures in St. Louis County, Missouri
1905 establishments in Missouri
20th-century attacks on synagogues and Jewish communal organizations in the United States
Former synagogues in the United States